The Château de Fresnay or Frênay is a French castle, 1.2 km to the north of Le Bourgneuf-la-Forêt in Mayenne. It is mentioned by Hubert Jaillot ("château, chapelle, étang et landes"), on the Carte de Cassini ("Château, village et bois percé d'allées convergentes"), and by Pierre-François Davelu ("Beau château et chapelle").

Fresnay